Goruru Ramaswamy Iyengar (1904–1991), popularly known as Goruru, was an Indian writer who wrote in Kannada. He was well known for his humour and satire.

Early life
Goruru Ramaswami Iyengar was born at "Goruru" in Hassan district of Karnataka in 1904. His father was Srinivas Iyengar and his mother Lakshamma.

Career
Goruru Ramaswami Iyengar was influenced by Indian Independence Movement and became a staunch follower of Mahatma Gandhi. He was jailed by the British administration in 1942 for 2 months for his participation in the Quit India Movement and in 1947. His son Ramachandra became a martyr for the same cause in 1947.

After Independence in 1947, Goruru worked in the industries. He began writing early in life with the celebrated books HALLIYA CHITHRAGALLU (1930) and NAMMA OORINA RASIKARU (1932). His "Amerikadalli Goruru" 1979, is a satirical travelogue of a true Indian in United States. It fetched him the Sahitya Akademi Award in 1981. His short story "Bhootayyana Maga Ayyu" (based on true events) was made into a Kannada movie of the same name by noted director S. Siddalingaiah in 1975. Novels Hemavathi and URVASHI were also made into movies. His travelogue was made into a television series. His other works include Rasaphala, Namma Oorina Rasikaru, Putta mallige, Hemavathi and Garudagambada Dasayya, MERAVANIGE. His Rajanartaki was a translation of the Gujarathi novel Amrapali by Ramachandra Thakore. He was nominated to Karnataka Legislative Council in 1952 in recognition of his literary contributions. In 1971 he was a recipient of an Honorary doctorate from the University of Mysore.

A road in Rajajinagar, Bangalore is named after him.

Death
Goruru Ramaswamy Iyengar died in 1991,september 28 at the age of 87. His birth centenary was celebrated in 2005. His memoirs of his childhood days, Goruru Avara Balyada Atma Kathe was published posthumously.

References

External links

1904 births
1991 deaths
Novelists from Karnataka
Kannada-language writers
People from Hassan district
Recipients of the Sahitya Akademi Award in Kannada
Indian satirists
Indian humorists
Indian independence activists from Karnataka
Indian travel writers
Indian male novelists
20th-century Indian novelists
20th-century Indian essayists
20th-century Indian male writers